Salant may refer to:

People
Henry Salant (1874–1952), New York state senator
Norman Salant (born 1953), American musician
Richard S. Salant (1914-1993), American television executive
Shmuel Salant (1816-1909), Ashkenazi Chief Rabbi of Jerusalem
Stephen Salant, American economist
Zundel Salant (1786-1866), Ashkenazi rabbi

Places
Salantai, also known as Salant, the basis of family names of 3 famous rabbis, 2 of whom are named above.